The Durham Cassiodorus (Durham, Cathedral Library, MS B. II. 30) is an 8th-century illuminated manuscript containing Cassiodorus's Explanation of the Psalms.  The manuscript was produced in Northumbria in about 730, and remains in the north-east of England in the library of Durham Cathedral.

The codex has 261 surviving folios. It is the earliest known copy of the commentary written by Cassiodorus in the sixth century and the hands of six scribes have been identified within it.

Illustrations 
The manuscript contains two surviving miniatures of King David, one of David as Victor (right) and one of David as Musician.  A third miniature is known to have existed, but does not survive.

External links 
Digitized Copy of Cassiodorus on the Psalms
More information at Earlier Latin Manuscripts

8th-century illuminated manuscripts
8th-century Christian texts
Christian illuminated manuscripts
Hiberno-Saxon manuscripts